Oregon Route 223 is a state highway in the U.S. State of Oregon, which runs between the town of Wren, Oregon and the city of Dallas, Oregon. It lies in Benton and Polk counties.

Route description
OR 223 begins at an intersection with U.S. Route 20 in Wren northwest of Philomath.  It continues north from there, through the western edge of the Willamette Valley.  In the town of Bridgeport, it intersects with OR 194.  The only major city on the route is Dallas, Oregon; north of Dallas, it ends at an intersection with OR 22.

Covered bridge

The Ritner Creek Bridge was the last covered bridge on a state highway in Oregon. It was on OR 223 between Pedee and Kings Valley, about 15 miles south of Dallas, or 10 miles north of the junction with US 20 in Wren. Built in 1927, the bridge was replaced in 1976 and relocated just downstream and parallel to the new span.

Major intersections

Related route

A spur route (signed as Oregon Route 223 Spur) runs from Dallas east, to an interchange with OR 22 and OR 99W in Rickreall.  The spur is a former OR 22 routing.

References

223
Transportation in Polk County, Oregon
Transportation in Benton County, Oregon
Dallas, Oregon